Shiqi Subdistrict, also known as Shiqiqu Subdistrict, is a subdistrict located in the center of Zhongshan city, covering an area of , and a population of about 227,200. The subdistrict administers 19 residential communities, and is home to major industrial and commercial activity.

Shiqi was historically spelled Shekki in English, and is nicknamed Tiecheng.

Local people mainly speak the Shiqi dialect, a Yue dialect related to Standard Cantonese.

Geography 
The subdistrict is located at the foot of Yandun Mountain. The Qi River is the primary river in the subdistrict.

Administrative subdivisions
As of 2020, Shiqi has administrative jurisdiction over the following 19 residential communities:

Demographics 
The subdistrict has a permanent population of about 227,200.

As of 2006, Shiqi Subdistrict had a permanent population of 169,400 and migrant population of 40,900.

Economy 

In recent years, Shiqi Subdistrict has attracted a number of national firms involves with financial and information services. The subdistrict is also home to a nationally-significant industrial park, the Guangdong Zhongshan Industrial Park.

In 2019, the subdistrict's gross domestic product grew 1.4%. As of 2019, retail sales in the subdistrict totaled ¥31.164 billion, tax revenue in the subdistrict totaled ¥4.534 billion, and foreign trade in the subdistrict totaled ¥17.695 billion. Shiqi's retail sales ranks first among township-level divisions in Zhongshan.

Statistics from 2006 report that the subdistrict hosts 11,767 unique enterprises.

Education 
The Zhongshan Institute of the University of Electronic Science and Technology of China is located in Shiqi Subdistrict.

Transportation
Located in the Pearl River Delta, Shiqi Subdistrict lies in close proximity to a number of major cities.

Road 
Both National Highway 105 and the  pass through the western parts of Shiqi Subdistrict.

Shiqi Subdistrict is currently served by the following bus lines operated by the Zhongshan Public Transportation Group Co.:

Rail

The subdistrict is served by the Zhongshan North railway station, located on the Guangzhou–Zhuhai intercity railway.

The station is located on Minke West Road in Shiqi Subistrict. It is the station nearest to the city centre of Zhongshan.

Water 

Tourist sites 

 
 Yueshan Park
 Sanshan Ancient Temple
 Baiyi Ancient Temple

Notable people 

 , Ming dynasty politician and scholar
 Xiao Youmei, composer
 Lü Wencheng, composer

See also
Other subdistricts of Zhongshan
 Dongqu Subdistrict
 Nanqu Subdistrict
 Xiqu Subdistrict
 Torch Hi-tech Industrial Development District
 Wuguishan District

Others
Shiqi dialect

References

Zhongshan
Township-level divisions of Guangdong
Subdistricts of the People's Republic of China